Þingvallavatn, anglicised as Thingvallavatn, is a rift valley lake in southwestern Iceland. With a surface of 84 km² it is the second-largest lake in Iceland. Its greatest depth is 114 m. At the northern shore of the lake, at Þingvellir (after which the lake is named), the Alþingi, the national parliament, was founded in the year 930, and held its sessions there until 1799 and still as of today the name Alþingi Íslendinga is carried by the parliament of Iceland.

The lake lies partially within Þingvellir National Park. The volcanic origin of the islands in the lake is clearly visible. The cracks and faults around it, of which the Almannagjá  ravine is the largest, is where the Eurasian and North American tectonic plates meet. Silfra fissure is a popular scuba and snorkeling site. The only outflow from lake Þingvallavatn is the river Sog.

One of the noted features of the lake is the presence of four morphs of the Arctic charr.

See also
List of lakes of Iceland
Volcanism of Iceland
Geography of Iceland

Notes and references

References

External links

Lakes of Iceland
Lava dammed lakes
Rift lakes of Iceland
Þingvellir